This is a list of the mammal species recorded in Kenya. Of these species, four are critically endangered, nine are endangered, eighteen are vulnerable, and fifteen are near threatened.

The following tags are used to highlight each species' conservation status as assessed by the International Union for Conservation of Nature:

Order: Afrosoricida (tenrecs and golden moles) 

The order Afrosoricida contains the golden moles of southern Africa and the tenrecs of Madagascar and Africa, two families of small mammals that were traditionally part of the order Insectivora.
Family: Tenrecidae (tenrecs)
Subfamily: Potamogalinae
Genus: Potamogale
Giant otter shrew, P. velox 
Family: Chrysochloridae
Subfamily: Chrysochlorinae
Genus: Chrysochloris 
Stuhlmann's golden mole, C. stuhlmanni

Order: Macroscelidea (elephant-shrews) 

Often called sengis, the elephant shrews or jumping shrews are native to southern Africa. Their common English name derives from their elongated flexible snout and their resemblance to the true shrews.
Family: Macroscelididae
Genus: Elephantulus
Short-snouted elephant shrew, E. brachyrhynchus 
Rufous elephant shrew, E. rufescens 
Genus: Petrodromus
Four-toed elephant shrew, P. tetradactylus 
Genus: Rhynchocyon
Golden-rumped elephant shrew, R. chrysopygus 
Black and rufous elephant shrew, Rhynchocyon petersi

Order: Tubulidentata (aardvarks) 

The order Tubulidentata consists of a single species, the aardvark. Tubulidentata are characterised by their teeth which lack a pulp cavity and form thin tubes which are continuously worn down and replaced.
Family: Orycteropodidae
Genus: Orycteropus
Aardvark, O. afer

Order: Hyracoidea (hyraxes) 

The hyraxes are any of four species of fairly small, thickset, herbivorous mammals in the order Hyracoidea. About the size of a domestic cat they are well-furred, with rounded bodies and a stumpy tail. They are native to Africa and the Middle East.
Family: Procaviidae
Genus: Dendrohyrax
Southern tree hyrax, D. arboreus 
Genus: Heterohyrax
Yellow-spotted rock hyrax, H. brucei 
Genus: Procavia
Cape hyrax, P. capensis

Order: Proboscidea (elephants) 

The elephants comprise three living species and are the largest living land animals.
Family: Elephantidae (elephants)
Genus: Loxodonta
African bush elephant, L. africana

Order: Sirenia (manatees and dugongs) 

Sirenia is an order of fully aquatic, herbivorous mammals that inhabit rivers, estuaries, coastal marine waters, swamps, and marine wetlands. All four species are endangered.
Family: Dugongidae
Genus: Dugong
Dugong, D. dugon

Order: Primates 

The order Primates contains humans and their closest relatives: lemurs, lorisoids, tarsiers, monkeys, and apes.

Suborder: Strepsirrhini
Infraorder: Lemuriformes
Superfamily: Lorisoidea
Family: Lorisidae (lorises, bushbabies)
Genus: Perodicticus
 Potto, P. potto  
Family: Galagidae
Genus: Galago
 Somali bushbaby, Galago gallarum
 Senegal bushbaby, Galago senegalensis
Genus: Galagoides
 Prince Demidoff's bushbaby, Galagoides demidovii
 Thomas's bushbaby, Galagoides thomasi
 Zanzibar bushbaby, Galagoides zanzibaricus
Genus: Otolemur
 Brown greater galago, Otolemur crassicaudatus
 Northern greater galago, Otolemur garnettii
Suborder: Haplorhini
Infraorder: Simiiformes
Parvorder: Catarrhini
Superfamily: Cercopithecoidea
Family: Cercopithecidae (Old World monkeys)
Genus: Erythrocebus
 Patas monkey, Erythrocebus patas
Genus: Chlorocebus
 Vervet monkey, Chlorocebus pygerythrus
 Tantalus monkey, Chlorocebus tantalus
Genus: Cercopithecus
 Red-tailed monkey, Cercopithecus ascanius
 Blue monkey, Cercopithecus mitis
 De Brazza's monkey, Cercopithecus neglectus
Genus: Lophocebus
 Grey-cheeked mangabey, Lophocebus albigena
Genus: Papio
 Olive baboon, Papio anubis
 Yellow baboon, Papio cynocephalus
Genus: Cercocebus
 Crested mangabey, Cercocebus galeritus
Subfamily: Colobinae
Genus: Colobus
 Angola colobus, Colobus angolensis
 Mantled guereza, Colobus guereza
Genus: Procolobus
 Tana River red colobus, Procolobus rufomitratus CR

Order: Rodentia (rodents) 

Rodents make up the largest order of mammals, with over 40% of mammalian species. They have two incisors in the upper and lower jaw which grow continually and must be kept short by gnawing.

Suborder: Hystricognathi
Family: Bathyergidae
Genus: Heliophobius
 Silvery mole-rat, Heliophobius argenteocinereus LC
Genus: Heterocephalus
 Naked mole-rat, Heterocephalus glaber LC
Family: Hystricidae (Old World porcupines)
Genus: Atherurus
 African brush-tailed porcupine, Atherurus africanus LC
Genus: Hystrix
 Cape porcupine, Hystrix africaeaustralis LC
 Crested porcupine, Hystrix cristata LC
Family: Thryonomyidae (cane rats)
Genus: Thryonomys
 Lesser cane rat, Thryonomys gregorianus LC
 Greater cane rat, Thryonomys swinderianus LC
Suborder: Sciurognathi
Family: Anomaluridae
Subfamily: Anomalurinae
Genus: Anomalurus
 Lord Derby's scaly-tailed squirrel, Anomalurus derbianus LC
Family: Pedetidae (spring hare)
Genus: Pedetes
 Springhare, Pedetes surdaster LC
Family: Sciuridae (squirrels)
Subfamily: Xerinae
Tribe: Xerini
Genus: Xerus
 Striped ground squirrel, Xerus erythropus LC
 Unstriped ground squirrel, Xerus rutilus LC
Tribe: Protoxerini
Genus: Heliosciurus
 Gambian sun squirrel, Heliosciurus gambianus LC
 Red-legged sun squirrel, Heliosciurus rufobrachium LC
 Zanj sun squirrel, Heliosciurus undulatus DD
Genus: Paraxerus
 Boehm's bush squirrel, Paraxerus boehmi LC
 Striped bush squirrel, Paraxerus flavovittis DD
 Ochre bush squirrel, Paraxerus ochraceus LC
 Red bush squirrel, Paraxerus palliatus LC
Genus: Protoxerus
 Forest giant squirrel, Protoxerus stangeri LC
Family: Gliridae (dormice)
Subfamily: Graphiurinae
Genus: Graphiurus
 Small-eared dormouse, Graphiurus microtis LC
 Kellen's dormouse, Graphiurus kelleni LC
Family: Spalacidae
Subfamily: Tachyoryctinae
Genus: Tachyoryctes
 Northeast African mole-rat, Tachyoryctes splendens
 Mianzini African mole-rat, Tachyoryctes annectens
 Aberdare Mountains African mole-rat, Tachyoryctes audax
 Demon African mole-rat, Tachyoryctes daemon
 Kenyan African mole-rat, Tachyoryctes ibeanus
 Navivasha African mole-rat, Tachyoryctes naivashae
 King African mole-rat, Tachyoryctes rex
 Rudd's African mole-rat, Tachyoryctes ruddi
 Embi African mole-rat, Tachyoryctes spalacinus
 Storey's African mole-rat, Tachyoryctes storeyi
Family: Nesomyidae
Subfamily: Dendromurinae
Genus: Dendromus
 Montane African climbing mouse, Dendromus insignis LC
 Brants's climbing mouse, Dendromus mesomelas LC
 Chestnut climbing mouse, Dendromus mystacalis LC
Genus: Steatomys
 Tiny fat mouse, Steatomys parvus LC
Subfamily: Cricetomyinae
Genus: Beamys
 Lesser hamster-rat, Beamys hindei NT
Genus: Cricetomys
 Emin's pouched rat, Cricetomys emini LC
 Gambian pouched rat, Cricetomys gambianus LC
Genus: Saccostomus
 Mearns's pouched mouse, Saccostomus mearnsi LC
Family: Cricetidae
Subfamily: Lophiomyinae
Genus: Lophiomys
 Maned rat, Lophiomys imhausi LC
Family: Muridae (mice, rats, voles, gerbils, hamsters, etc.)
Subfamily: Deomyinae
Genus: Acomys
 Gray spiny mouse, Acomys cineraceus LC
 Fiery spiny mouse, Acomys ignitus LC
 Kemp's spiny mouse, Acomys kempi LC
 Louise's spiny mouse, Acomys louisae LC
 Percival's spiny mouse, Acomys percivali LC
 Wilson's spiny mouse, Acomys wilsoni LC
Genus: Lophuromys
 Yellow-spotted brush-furred rat, Lophuromys flavopunctatus LC
 Rusty-bellied brush-furred rat, Lophuromys sikapusi LC
Genus: Uranomys
 Rudd's mouse, Uranomys ruddi LC
Subfamily: Otomyinae
Genus: Otomys
 Angoni vlei rat, Otomys angoniensis LC
 Barbour's vlei rat, Otomys barbouri EN
 Dollman's vlei rat, Otomys dollmani DD
 Mount Elgon vlei rat, Otomys jacksoni EN
 Tanzanian vlei rat, Otomys lacustris NT
 Afroalpine vlei rat, Otomys orestes DD
 Thomas's vlei rat, Otomys thomasi VU
 Tropical vlei rat, Otomys tropicalis LC
 Mount Kilimanjaro vlei rat, Otomys zinki VU
Subfamily: Gerbillinae
Genus: Gerbillus
 Botta's gerbil, Gerbillus bottai DD
 Agag gerbil, Gerbillus agag DD
 Harwood's gerbil, Gerbillus harwoodi LC
 Cushioned gerbil, Gerbillus pulvinatus LC
 Least gerbil, Gerbillus pusillus LC
Genus: Tatera
 Boehm's gerbil, Tatera boehmi LC
 Kemp's gerbil, Tatera kempi LC
 Bushveld gerbil, Tatera leucogaster LC
 Black-tailed gerbil, Tatera nigricauda LC
 Phillips's gerbil, Tatera phillipsi LC
 Fringe-tailed gerbil, Tatera robusta LC
 Savanna gerbil, Tatera valida LC
Genus: Taterillus
 Emin's gerbil, Taterillus emini LC
 Harrington's gerbil, Taterillus harringtoni LC
Subfamily: Murinae
Genus: Aethomys
 Red rock rat, Aethomys chrysophilus LC
 Hinde's rock rat, Aethomys hindei LC
 Kaiser's rock rat, Aethomys kaiseri LC
Genus: Arvicanthis
 Nairobi grass rat, Arvicanthis nairobae LC
 African grass rat, Arvicanthis niloticus LC
 Neumann's grass rat, Arvicanthis neumanni DD
Genus: Colomys
 African wading rat, Colomys goslingi LC
Genus: Dasymys
 African marsh rat, Dasymys incomtus LC
Genus: Grammomys
 Gray-headed thicket rat, Grammomys caniceps DD
 Woodland thicket rat, Grammomys dolichurus LC
 Giant thicket rat, Grammomys gigas EN
 Ruwenzori thicket rat, Grammomys ibeanus LC
 Macmillan's thicket rat, Grammomys macmillani LC
Genus: Hylomyscus
 Montane wood mouse, Hylomyscus denniae LC
 Stella wood mouse, Hylomyscus stella LC
Genus: Lemniscomys
 Buffoon striped grass mouse, Lemniscomys macculus LC
 Single-striped grass mouse, Lemniscomys rosalia LC
 Typical striped grass mouse, Lemniscomys striatus LC
 Heuglin's striped grass mouse, Lemniscomys zebra LC
Genus: Mastomys
 Guinea multimammate mouse, Mastomys erythroleucus LC
 Natal multimammate mouse, Mastomys natalensis LC
 Dwarf multimammate mouse, Mastomys pernanus DD
Genus: Mus
 Mahomet mouse, Mus mahomet LC
 African pygmy mouse, Mus minutoides LC
 Peters's mouse, Mus setulosus LC
 Thomas's pygmy mouse, Mus sorella LC
 Delicate mouse, Mus tenellus LC
 Gray-bellied pygmy mouse, Mus triton LC
Genus: Mylomys
 African groove-toothed rat, Mylomys dybowskii LC
Genus: Myomyscus
 Brockman's rock mouse, Myomyscus brockmani LC
Genus: Oenomys
 Common rufous-nosed rat, Oenomys hypoxanthus LC
Genus: Pelomys
 Creek groove-toothed swamp rat, Pelomys fallax LC
 Hopkins's groove-toothed swamp rat, Pelomys hopkinsi VU
Genus: Praomys
 Delectable soft-furred mouse, Praomys delectorum NT
 Jackson's soft-furred mouse, Praomys jacksoni LC
 Misonne's soft-furred mouse, Praomys misonnei LC
Genus: Rhabdomys
 Four-striped grass mouse, Rhabdomys pumilio LC
Genus: Thallomys
 Loring's rat, Thallomys loringi LC
 Acacia rat, Thallomys paedulcus LC
Genus: Zelotomys
 Hildegarde's broad-headed mouse, Zelotomys hildegardeae LC

Order: Lagomorpha (lagomorphs) 

The lagomorphs comprise two families, Leporidae (hares and rabbits), and Ochotonidae (pikas). Though they can resemble rodents, and were classified as a superfamily in that order until the early 20th century, they have since been considered a separate order. They differ from rodents in a number of physical characteristics, such as having four incisors in the upper jaw rather than two.
Family: Leporidae (rabbits, hares)
Genus: Pronolagus
 Smith's red rock hare, P. rupestris
Genus: Lepus
Cape hare, L. capensis 
Ethiopian hare, L. fagani 
African savanna hare, L. victoriae

Order: Erinaceomorpha (hedgehogs and gymnures) 

The order Erinaceomorpha contains a single family, Erinaceidae, which comprise the hedgehogs and gymnures. The hedgehogs are easily recognised by their spines while gymnures look more like large rats.
Family: Erinaceidae (hedgehogs)
Subfamily: Erinaceinae
Genus: Atelerix
 Four-toed hedgehog, Atelerix albiventris

Order: Soricomorpha (shrews, moles, and solenodons) 

The "shrew-forms" are insectivorous mammals. The shrews and solenodons closely resemble mice while the moles are stout-bodied burrowers.

Family: Soricidae (shrews)
Subfamily: Crocidurinae
Genus: Crocidura
 East African highland shrew, Crocidura allex LC
 Bottego's shrew, Crocidura bottegi DD
 Elgon shrew, Crocidura elgonius LC
 Fischer's shrew, Crocidura fischeri DD
 Savanna shrew, Crocidura fulvastra LC
 Smoky white-toothed shrew, Crocidura fumosa LC
 Bicolored musk shrew, Crocidura fuscomurina LC
 Hildegarde's shrew, Crocidura hildegardeae LC
 Jackson's shrew, Crocidura jacksoni LC
 Butiaba naked-tailed shrew, Crocidura littoralis LC
 Moonshine shrew, Crocidura luna LC
 MacArthur's shrew, Crocidura macarthuri LC
 Nyiro shrew, Crocidura macowi DD
 Dark shrew, Crocidura maurisca DD
 Kilimanjaro shrew, Crocidura monax DD
 Montane white-toothed shrew, Crocidura montis LC
 Savanna dwarf shrew, Crocidura nanilla LC
 African black shrew, Crocidura nigrofusca LC
 African giant shrew, Crocidura olivieri LC
 Small-footed shrew, Crocidura parvipes LC
 Rainey's shrew, Crocidura raineyi DD
 Ugandan lowland shrew, Crocidura selina LC
 Turbo shrew, Crocidura turba LC
 Ultimate shrew, Crocidura ultima DD
 Savanna path shrew, Crocidura viaria LC
 Voi shrew, Crocidura voi LC
 Xanthippe's shrew, Crocidura xantippe LC
 Yankari shrew, Crocidura yankariensis LC
 Zaphir's shrew, Crocidura zaphiri DD
Genus: Suncus
 Least dwarf shrew, Suncus infinitesimus LC
 Greater dwarf shrew, Suncus lixus LC
Genus: Sylvisorex
 Grant's forest shrew, Sylvisorex granti LC
 Climbing shrew, Sylvisorex megalura LC
Subfamily: Myosoricinae
Genus: Surdisorex
 Aberdare mole shrew, Surdisorex norae VU
 Mount Kenya mole shrew, Surdisorex polulus VU

Order: Chiroptera (bats) 

The bats' most distinguishing feature is that their forelimbs are developed as wings, making them the only mammals capable of flight. Bat species account for about 20% of all mammals.
Family: Pteropodidae (flying foxes, Old World fruit bats)
Subfamily: Pteropodinae
Genus: Eidolon
 Straw-coloured fruit bat, Eidolon helvum LC
Genus: Epomophorus
 Ethiopian epauletted fruit bat, Epomophorus labiatus LC
 East African epauletted fruit bat, Epomophorus minimus LC
 Wahlberg's epauletted fruit bat, Epomophorus wahlbergi LC
Genus: Hypsignathus
 Hammer-headed bat, Hypsignathus monstrosus LC
Genus: Lissonycteris
 Angolan rousette, Lissonycteris angolensis LC
Genus: Micropteropus
 Peters's dwarf epauletted fruit bat, Micropteropus pusillus LC
Genus: Myonycteris
 East African little collared fruit bat, Myonycteris relicta VU
Genus: Rousettus
 Egyptian fruit bat, Rousettus aegyptiacus LC
 Long-haired rousette, Rousettus lanosus LC
Family: Vespertilionidae
Subfamily: Kerivoulinae
Genus: Kerivoula
 Damara woolly bat, Kerivoula argentata LC
 Lesser woolly bat, Kerivoula lanosa LC
 Smith's woolly bat, Kerivoula smithi LC
Subfamily: Myotinae
Genus: Myotis
 Rufous mouse-eared bat, Myotis bocagii LC
 Cape hairy bat, Myotis tricolor LC
 Welwitsch's bat, Myotis welwitschii LC
Subfamily: Vespertilioninae
Genus: Eptesicus
 Long-tailed house bat, Eptesicus hottentotus LC
Genus: Glauconycteris
 Silvered bat, Glauconycteris argentata LC
 Beatrix's bat, Glauconycteris beatrix NT
 Allen's spotted bat, Glauconycteris humeralis DD
 Kenyan wattled bat, Glauconycteris kenyacola DD
 Abo bat, Glauconycteris poensis LC
 Butterfly bat, Glauconycteris variegata LC
Genus: Hypsugo
 Broad-headed pipistrelle, Hypsugo crassulus LC
 Eisentraut's pipistrelle, Hypsugo eisentrauti DD
Genus: Laephotis
 De Winton's long-eared bat, Laephotis wintoni LC
Genus: Mimetillus
 Moloney's mimic bat, Mimetillus moloneyi LC
Genus: Neoromicia
 Cape serotine, Neoromicia capensis LC
 Heller's pipistrelle, Neoromicia helios DD
 Melck's house bat, Neoromicia melckorum DD
 Banana pipistrelle, Neoromicia nanus LC
 Rendall's serotine, Neoromicia rendalli LC
 Somali serotine, Neoromicia somalicus LC
 White-winged serotine, Neoromicia tenuipinnis LC
 Zulu serotine, Neoromicia zuluensis LC
Genus: Nycticeinops
 Schlieffen's bat, Nycticeinops schlieffeni LC
Genus: Pipistrellus
 Mount Gargues pipistrelle, Pipistrellus aero VU
 Egyptian pipistrelle, Pipistrellus deserti LC
 Tiny pipistrelle, Pipistrellus nanulus LC
 Rüppell's pipistrelle, Pipistrellus rueppelli LC
 Rusty pipistrelle, Pipistrellus rusticus LC
Genus: Scotoecus
 White-bellied lesser house bat, Scotoecus albigula DD
 Light-winged lesser house bat, Scotoecus albofuscus DD
 Hinde's lesser house bat, Scotoecus hindei DD
 Dark-winged lesser house bat, Scotoecus hirundo DD
Genus: Scotophilus
 African yellow bat, Scotophilus dinganii LC
 White-bellied yellow bat, Scotophilus leucogaster LC
 Schreber's yellow bat, Scotophilus nigrita NT
 Nut-colored yellow bat, Scotophilus nux LC
 Greenish yellow bat, Scotophilus viridis LC
Subfamily: Miniopterinae
Genus: Miniopterus
 African long-fingered bat, M. africanus LC
 Lesser long-fingered bat, M. fraterculus LC
 Greater long-fingered bat, M. inflatus LC
 Least long-fingered bat, M. minor NT
 Natal long-fingered bat, M. natalensis NT
Common bent-wing bat, M. schreibersii 
Family: Rhinopomatidae
Genus: Rhinopoma
 Lesser mouse-tailed bat, Rhinopoma hardwickei LC
 Macinnes's mouse-tailed bat, Rhinopoma macinnesi VU
Family: Molossidae
Genus: Chaerephon
 Gland-tailed free-tailed bat, Chaerephon bemmeleni LC
 Spotted free-tailed bat, Chaerephon bivittata LC
 Chapin's free-tailed bat, Chaerephon chapini DD
 Lappet-eared free-tailed bat, Chaerephon major LC
 Little free-tailed bat, Chaerephon pumila LC
 Russet free-tailed bat, Chaerephon russata NT
Genus: Mops
 Sierra Leone free-tailed bat, Mops brachypterus LC
 Angolan free-tailed bat, Mops condylurus LC
 Mongalla free-tailed bat, Mops demonstrator NT
 Midas free-tailed bat, Mops midas LC
 Dwarf free-tailed bat, Mops nanulus LC
 Railer bat, Mops thersites LC
Genus: Otomops
 Large-eared free-tailed bat, Otomops martiensseni NT
Genus: Platymops
 Peters's flat-headed bat, Platymops setiger DD
Genus: Tadarida
 Egyptian free-tailed bat, Tadarida aegyptiaca LC
 Madagascan large free-tailed bat, Tadarida fulminans LC
 Kenyan big-eared free-tailed bat, Tadarida lobata DD
 African giant free-tailed bat, Tadarida ventralis NT
Family: Emballonuridae
Genus: Coleura
 African sheath-tailed bat, Coleura afra LC
Genus: Saccolaimus
 Pel's pouched bat, Saccolaimus peli NT
Genus: Taphozous
 Hamilton's tomb bat, Taphozous hamiltoni NT
 Hildegarde's tomb bat, Taphozous hildegardeae VU
 Mauritian tomb bat, Taphozous mauritianus LC
 Naked-rumped tomb bat, Taphozous nudiventris LC
 Egyptian tomb bat, Taphozous perforatus LC
Family: Nycteridae
Genus: Nycteris
 Bate's slit-faced bat, Nycteris arge LC
 Andersen's slit-faced bat, Nycteris aurita DD
 Large slit-faced bat, Nycteris grandis LC
 Hairy slit-faced bat, Nycteris hispida LC
 Large-eared slit-faced bat, Nycteris macrotis LC
 Dwarf slit-faced bat, Nycteris nana LC
 Egyptian slit-faced bat, Nycteris thebaica LC
Family: Megadermatidae
Genus: Cardioderma
 Heart-nosed bat, Cardioderma cor LC
Genus: Lavia
 Yellow-winged bat, Lavia frons LC
Family: Rhinolophidae
Subfamily: Rhinolophinae
Genus: Rhinolophus
 Halcyon horseshoe bat, Rhinolophus alcyone LC
 Geoffroy's horseshoe bat, Rhinolophus clivosus LC
 Darling's horseshoe bat, Rhinolophus darlingi LC
 Decken's horseshoe bat, Rhinolophus deckenii DD
 Eloquent horseshoe bat, Rhinolophus eloquens DD
 Rüppell's horseshoe bat, Rhinolophus fumigatus LC
 Hildebrandt's horseshoe bat, Rhinolophus hildebrandti LC
 Lander's horseshoe bat, Rhinolophus landeri LC
 Bushveld horseshoe bat, Rhinolophus simulator LC
Subfamily: Hipposiderinae
Genus: Cloeotis
 Percival's trident bat, Cloeotis percivali VU
Genus: Hipposideros
 Sundevall's roundleaf bat, Hipposideros caffer LC
 Greater roundleaf bat, Hipposideros camerunensis DD
 Cyclops roundleaf bat, Hipposideros cyclops LC
 Giant roundleaf bat, Hipposideros gigas LC
 Commerson's roundleaf bat, Hipposideros marungensis NT
 Ethiopian large-eared roundleaf bat, Hipposideros megalotis NT
 Noack's roundleaf bat, Hipposideros ruber LC
Genus: Triaenops
 Persian trident bat, Triaenops persicus LC

Order: Pholidota (pangolins) 

The order Pholidota comprises the eight species of pangolin. Pangolins are anteaters and have the powerful claws, elongated snout and long tongue seen in the other unrelated anteater species.
Family: Manidae
Genus: Phataginus
Tree pangolin, P. tricuspis 
Genus Smutsia
Giant pangolin, S. gigantea 
Ground pangolin, S. temminckii

Order: Cetacea (whales) 

The order Cetacea includes whales, dolphins and porpoises. They are the mammals most fully adapted to aquatic life with a spindle-shaped nearly hairless body, protected by a thick layer of blubber, and forelimbs and tail modified to provide propulsion underwater.
Suborder: Mysticeti
Family: Balaenopteridae
Subfamily: Balaenopterinae
Genus: Balaenoptera
 Common minke whale, Balaenoptera acutorostrata LC
 Sei whale, Balaenoptera borealis EN
 Bryde's whale, Balaenoptera edeni DD
 Blue whale, Balaenoptera musculus EN
 Fin whale, Balaenoptera physalus EN
Subfamily: Megapterinae
Genus: Megaptera
 Humpback whale, Megaptera novaeangliae VU
Suborder: Odontoceti
Superfamily: Platanistoidea
Family: Physeteridae
Genus: Physeter
 Sperm whale, Physeter macrocephalus VU
Family: Kogiidae
Genus: Kogia
Pygmy sperm whale, K. breviceps 
 Dwarf sperm whale, Kogia sima
Family: Ziphidae
Subfamily: Hyperoodontinae
Genus: Indopacetus
 Longman's beaked whale, Indopacetus pacificus DD
Genus: Ziphius
 Cuvier's beaked whale, Ziphius cavirostris DD
Genus: Mesoplodon
 Blainville's beaked whale, Mesoplodon densirostris DD
 Ginkgo-toothed beaked whale, Mesoplodon ginkgodens DD
Family: Delphinidae (marine dolphins)
Genus: Steno
 Rough-toothed dolphin, Steno bredanensis DD
Genus: Sousa
 Indian humpback dolphin, Sousa plumbea DD
Genus: Tursiops
 Indo-Pacific bottlenose dolphin, Tursiops aduncus DD
 Common bottlenose dolphin, Tursiops truncatus DD
Genus: Stenella
 Pantropical spotted dolphin, Stenella attenuata
 Striped dolphin, Stenella coeruleoalba
 Spinner dolphin, Stenella longirostris
Genus: Lagenodelphis
 Fraser's dolphin, Lagenodelphis hosei DD
Genus: Grampus
 Risso's dolphin, Grampus griseus DD
Genus: Feresa
 Pygmy killer whale, Feresa attenuata DD
Genus: Pseudorca
 False killer whale, Pseudorca crassidens
Genus: Orcinus
Orca, O. orca 
Genus: Globicephala
 Short-finned pilot whale, Globicephala macrorhynchus
Genus: Peponocephala
 Melon-headed whale, Peponocephala electra DD

Order: Carnivora (carnivorans) 

There are over 260 species of carnivorans, the majority of which eat meat as their primary dietary item. They have a characteristic skull shape and dentition.
Suborder: Feliformia
Family: Felidae (cats)
Subfamily: Felinae
Genus: Acinonyx
Cheetah, A. jubatus 
Southeast African cheetah, A. j. jubatus
Genus: Caracal
Caracal, C. caracal 
African golden cat, C. aurata  presence uncertain
Genus: Felis
African wildcat, F. lybica 
Genus: Leptailurus
Serval, L. serval 
Subfamily: Pantherinae
Genus: Panthera
Lion, P. leo 
P. l. melanochaita
Leopard, P. pardus 
African leopard, Panthera pardus pardus
Family: Viverridae
Subfamily: Viverrinae
Genus: Civettictis
African civet, C. civetta 
Genus: Genetta
Common genet, G. genetta 
Rusty-spotted genet, G. maculata 
Servaline genet, G. servalina 
Family: Nandiniidae
Genus: Nandinia
African palm civet, N. binotata 
Family: Herpestidae (mongooses)
Genus: Atilax
Marsh mongoose, A. paludinosus 
Genus: BdeogaleBushy-tailed mongoose, B. crassicauda 
Jackson's mongoose, B. jacksoni 
Genus: HelogaleEthiopian dwarf mongoose, H. hirtula 
Common dwarf mongoose, H. parvula 
Genus: HerpestesEgyptian mongoose, H. ichneumon 
Somalian slender mongoose, H. ochracheus 
Common slender mongoose, H. sanguineus 
Genus: IchneumiaWhite-tailed mongoose, I. albicauda 
Genus: MungosBanded mongoose, M. mungo 
Family: Hyaenidae (hyaenas)
Genus: CrocutaSpotted hyena, C. crocuta 
Genus: HyaenaStriped hyena, H. hyaena 
Genus: ProtelesAardwolf, P. cristata 
Suborder: Caniformia
Family: Canidae (dogs, foxes)
Genus: CanisAfrican golden wolf, C. lupaster 
Genus: Lupulella Side-striped jackal, L. adusta  
 Black-backed jackal, L. mesomelas  
Genus: OtocyonBat-eared fox, O. megalotis 
Genus: LycaonAfrican wild dog, L. pictus 
Family: Mustelidae (mustelids)
Genus: IctonyxStriped polecat, I. striatus 
Genus: PoecilogaleAfrican striped weasel, P. albinucha 
Genus: MellivoraHoney badger, M. capensis 
Genus: HydrictisSpeckle-throated otter, H. maculicollis 
Genus: AonyxAfrican clawless otter, A. capensis 

 Order: Perissodactyla (odd-toed ungulates) 

The odd-toed ungulates are browsing and grazing mammals. They are usually large to very large, and have relatively simple stomachs and a large middle toe.

Family: Equidae (horses etc.)
Genus: Equus Grevy's zebra, E. grevyi 
Plains zebra, E. quagga 
Grant's zebra, E. q. boehmi 
Maneless zebra, E. q. borensis 
Family: Rhinocerotidae
Genus: DicerosBlack rhinoceros, D. bicornis 
Uganda black rhinoceros, D. b. ladoensis 
Eastern black rhinoceros, D. b. michaeliGenus: CeratotheriumWhite rhinoceros, C. simumSouthern white rhinoceros, C. s. simum  reintroduced

 Order: Artiodactyla (even-toed ungulates) 

The even-toed ungulates are ungulates whose weight is borne about equally by the third and fourth toes, rather than mostly or entirely by the third as in perissodactyls. There are about 220 artiodactyl species, including many that are of great economic importance to humans.
Family: Suidae (pigs)
Subfamily: Phacochoerinae
Genus: Phacochoerus Desert warthog, Phacochoerus aethiopicus Common warthog, Phacochoerus africanusSubfamily: Suinae
Genus: Hylochoerus Giant forest hog, Hylochoerus meinertzhageniGenus: Potamochoerus Bushpig, Potamochoerus larvatusFamily: Hippopotamidae (hippopotamuses)
Genus: Hippopotamus Hippopotamus, Hippopotamus amphibius VU
Family: Giraffidae (giraffe, okapi)
Genus: GiraffaNubian giraffe, Giraffa camelopardalis camelopardalis CR
 Reticulated giraffe, Giraffa reticulata VU
 Masai giraffe, Giraffa tippelskirchi VU
 Rothschild's giraffe, Giraffa camelopardalis rothschildi EN
Family: Bovidae (cattle, antelope, sheep, goats)
Subfamily: Alcelaphinae
Genus: AlcelaphusHartebeest, A. buselaphus 
Genus: Connochaetes Blue wildebeest, Connochaetes taurinusGenus: Damaliscus Topi, Damaliscus lunatusGenus: Beatragus Hirola, Beatragus hunteri CR
Subfamily: Antilopinae
Genus: Gazella Grant's gazelle, Gazella granti Soemmerring's gazelle, Gazella soemmerringii VU
 Thomson's gazelle, Gazella thomsoniiGenus: Litocranius Gerenuk, Litocranius walleriGenus: Madoqua Günther's dik-dik, Madoqua guentheri Kirk's dik-dik, Madoqua kirkii Salt's dik-dik, Madoqua saltianaGenus: Neotragus Suni, Neotragus moschatusGenus: Oreotragus Klipspringer, Oreotragus oreotragusGenus: Ourebia Oribi, Ourebia ourebiGenus: Raphicerus Steenbok, Raphicerus campestrisSubfamily: Bovinae
Genus: SyncerusAfrican buffalo, S. caffer 
Genus: Tragelaphus Bongo, Tragelaphus eurycerus Lesser kudu, Tragelaphus imberbis Common eland, Tragelaphus oryx Bushbuck, Tragelaphus scriptus Sitatunga, Tragelaphus spekii Greater kudu, Tragelaphus strepsicerosSubfamily: Cephalophinae
Genus: Cephalophus Aders's duiker, Cephalophus adersi CR
 Peters's duiker, Cephalophus callipygus Harvey's duiker, Cephalophus harveyi Blue duiker, Cephalophus monticola Black-fronted duiker, Cephalophus nigrifrons Yellow-backed duiker, Cephalophus silvicultor Weyns's duiker, Cephalophus weynsiGenus: Sylvicapra Common duiker, Sylvicapra grimmiaSubfamily: Hippotraginae
Genus: Hippotragus Roan antelope, Hippotragus equinus Sable antelope, Hippotragus nigerGenus: Oryx Common beisa oryx, Oryx beisa beisa Fringe-eared oryx, Oryx beisa callotis VU
Subfamily: Aepycerotinae
Genus: Aepyceros Impala, Aepyceros melampusSubfamily: Reduncinae
Genus: Kobus Waterbuck, Kobus ellipsiprymnus Kob, Kobus kobGenus: Redunca Mountain reedbuck, Redunca fulvorufula LC
 Bohor reedbuck, Redunca redunca''

See also
List of chordate orders
Lists of mammals by region
List of prehistoric mammals
Mammal classification
List of mammals described in the 2000s

References

External links

Kenya
Kenya

Mammals